The Long Beach State 49ers college football team represented California State University, Long Beach in the Big West Conference. The 49ers competed in the National Collegiate Athletic Association (NCAA) College Division as an independent in its first three years (1958–1968), then in the California Collegiate Athletic Association (CCAA) from 1958–1968. In 1969, the team moved to National Collegiate Athletic Association (NCAA) Division I, and stayed there until the program was disbanded after the 1991 season.

The program had 9 head coaches in its 37 years of existence. Jim Stangeland led the 49ers to its only bowl game, a 1970 Pasadena Bowl matchup against the Louisville Cardinals.

Coaches

References

Long Beach State 49ers

Long Beach State 49ers football